MES Garware College of Commerce was established in 1967 as an independent commerce college, Pune. The college was renamed as “M.E.S. Garware College of Commerce” in 1971. At present the college provides education up to Ph.D. level. The strength of students is about 3000. In 2021 the college has been conferred the Autonomous status from UGC and will be affiliated to the Savitribai Phule Pune University. College bagged ‘A’ grade from the National Assessment and Accreditation Council (NAAC), scoring grade points 3.45 out of 4 (in 3rd cycle). It is recognized by the University Grants Commission (UGC). The college infrastructure includes  buildings and library, computer laboratories, reading halls, hostel, gymnasium.

College committees 
 National Cadet Corps (NCC)
 National Service Scheme (NSS)
 Competitive Examinations Centre
 Dept. of Research, Innovations & Consultancy
 Business Lab
 Startup and Innovation Cell (E-Cell)
 Placement Cell
 International Relations Committee 
 Soft Skills Development Centre
 Dramatics and Cultural Association 
 Youth Red Cross
 Anti-ragging & Discipline Committee 
 Alumni Association
 Vidyarthini Manch

Recognition 
The college is recognized by the University Grants Commission (UGC).

Accreditation
 November 2016, received 'A' grade by the National Assessment and Accreditation Council (NAAC)

Teaching-learning approach

 Assignments
 Case Studies
 Classroom Learning
 Excursion Tours
 Field Researches
 Guest Lectures
 Industry Visits
 Meditation & Yoga
 Panel Discussions
 Presentations
 Quizzes
 Research Projects
 Role Plays and Management Games
 Team Work

Notable alumni and faculty 

Notable alumni of MES Garware College of Commerce include 

 Prakash Javdekar, Minister of Environment -Forest and Climate Change, Minister of Information and Broadcasting
 Sanjeev Abhyankar - Hindustani Classical Music Vocalist

Notable faculty members include 
 D. M. Mirasdar - Marathi writer and narrator

References

External links 

M.E.S. Official website

Colleges affiliated to Savitribai Phule Pune University
Educational institutions established in 1967
1967 establishments in Maharashtra
Maharashtra Education Society